Kasar Vadavali is a region located on Ghodbunder Road of Thane city in Maharashtra state in India. The area lying between the regions of Waghbil and Bhainderpada is called Kasar Vadavali or simply Vadavali. The area has seen massive population growth with a lot of new residential and commercial projects being completed in the last decade, along with the rise of commercial activity.

Ghodbunder Road has rich historical importance and a cultural heritage which dates back to about 600 AD. Two of its temples here are well-known. The one at Kasarvadavali one of the temples is but a minute's drive off the main road. As you turn right at Kasarvadavali junction; straight ahead is a Dargah, behind which is a temple. It is popularly called ‘Ram Temple’.

Vishnu Khare the Pujari confirms, "It houses a deity known as ‘Sesh Narayan’ supposedly the only one in Maharashtra though it is extremely popular and common down in south India. No one seems to recollect how that particular idol of the sleeping Lord Vishnu existed here.

The temple is also extremely popular for the mannat of 16 Mondays where wishes are fulfilled. Another is the ‘Jagrut’ of the Hanuman Idol on Saturdays." There is only one aarti in the morning at 5.30. The main festivities are on Mahashivratri, Ram Navami, Hanuman Jayanti, Datta Jayanti and the Harinaam Saptah which comes just after Ganesh festival. During the festivity more than 5000 people arrive to the temple.

The temple which is located on a lake side and is quiet, scenic and utterly relaxing from inside. It is reputed to be about a hundred and fifty years old and was renovated in 1982. The temple is normally opened between 5 in the morning till 10 at night, but open 24  hours during the main festival days like Mahashivratri, Ram Navami etc. Khare added "Three other small temples are here one is Sheeatla Mata, Kalika Mata and Zari Mari Mata."

References

Neighbourhoods in Thane
Villages in Thane district